Chahar Deh (also Romanized as Chahār Deh and Chehārdeh; also known as Chahar Dāng) is a village in Rostaq Rural District, Rostaq District, Darab County, Fars Province, Iran. At the 2006 census, its population was 225,[54 families].

References 

Populated places in Darab County